Normangee Independent School District is a public school district based in Normangee, Texas (USA). Located in Leon County, a small portion of the district extends into Madison County.

Schools
The district has two campuses – 
Normangee High School (Grades 7-12) 
Normangee Elementary School (Grades PK-6)

In 2009, the school district was rated "academically acceptable" by the Texas Education Agency.

References

External links
Normangee ISD

School districts in Leon County, Texas
School districts in Madison County, Texas